Alessandro Focosi (June 14, 1836 – February 1, 1869) was an Italian painter born in Milan.

Biography
The son of the painter and illustrator Roberto Focosi, Alessandro completed his artistic training at the Brera Academy of Fine Arts, where Francesco Hayez was his master. Focosi won numerous academic prizes, and received a grant from the Brera that enabled him to visit Florence, Rome and Turin for study purposes during the period 1858–60.

He returned to Milan by 1866, and specialised in Romantic treatments of historical and literary subjects that were widely praised and received official recognition. In 1866, he painted a Catherine de' Medici induces Charles IX to exile the Huguenots and in 1868, Carlo Emanuele of Savoy confronts the Ambassador of Spain. The latter painting won the first prize, 10,000 lire, in a national contest instituted in 1866 by minister Broglio. He was made an honorary member of the Brera Academy of Fine Arts in 1863. In addition to the exhibitions of the Brera and the Promotrice in Turin, his works were also shown at the Universal Exhibition in Paris in 1867 and the Munich Exhibition of Fine Arts in 1869.

References

 Elena Lissoni, Alessandro Focosi, online catalogue Artgate by Fondazione Cariplo, 2010, CC BY-SA (source for the first revision of this article).

External links

19th-century Italian painters
Italian male painters
Painters from Milan
Brera Academy alumni
1836 births
1869 deaths
19th-century Italian male artists